Patipat Robroo (Thai ปฎิภัทร รอบรู้ ), is a Thai football coach and former player who is currently the head coach of Thai League 1 club Khon Kaen United. He plays for Thailand Premier League clubside Samut Songkhram FC.

Managerial statistics

References

1981 births
Living people
Patipat Rorbru
Association football defenders
Patipat Rorbru
Patipat Rorbru